Gangsta Lean is the only studio album by American contemporary R&B/hip hop group DRS, released October 25, 1993 via Hammer's Roll Wit It Entertainment (which was distributed by Capitol Records). The album peaked at No. 34 on the Billboard 200 and No. 6 on the Billboard R&B chart.

Two singles were released from the album: "Gangsta Lean" and "Skoundrels Get Lonely". However, "Gangsta Lean" was the group's only hit on the Billboard Hot 100, peaking at No. 4 in 1993. It also spent six weeks at No. 1 on the Billboard R&B chart. 

In addition to original songs, the album contains a cover version of "Do Me, Baby" by Prince.

Track listing

Charts

Weekly charts

Year-end charts

Certifications

References

External links 
 

1993 debut albums
Capitol Records albums
Contemporary R&B albums by American artists
Hip hop albums by American artists